Oberea oculata is a species of beetle in the family Cerambycidae. It was described by Carl Linnaeus in 1758, originally under the genus Cerambyx. It has a wide distribution throughout Europe. It feeds on Salix alba, Salix acutifolia, Salix pentandra, Salix caprea, and Salix triandra, and serves as a host for the parasitic wasp Ephialtes manifestator.

References

Beetles described in 1758
Taxa named by Carl Linnaeus
octava